is a Japanese animation producer for Production I.G. He was responsible for overseeing the hand-drawn anime sequences in Kill Bill Volume 1. Morishita also produced an anime by the name of Dead Leaves. Currently, he's expected to be president of new I.G Port animation subsidiary, SIGNAL.MD.

References

External links

Japanese animators
Japanese animated film producers
Living people
Year of birth missing (living people)